WPR may refer to:

 War Powers Resolution, a 1973 U.S. federal law limiting the power of the president to declare war
 Washington Post Radio, a short-lived attempt to create an all-news radio network in Washington, D.C.
 West Point Route, a short hand name for the joint operations of the Atlanta and West Point Railroad and the Western Railway of Alabama
 Wisconsin Public Radio, a public-radio network in the U.S. state of Wisconsin
 Women's Parliamentary Radio, a British website
 Wyoming Public Radio, a public-radio network in the U.S. state of Wyoming
 Weka Pass Railway, a New Zealand heritage railway
 WPR, railway station code for Wanparti Road, in the Indian state of Telangana
 WPR, the Windows Performance Recorder
 WPr, the German-language abbreviation of Wehrmacht Propaganda Troops (Wehrmachtpropaganda) 
 WPR, IATA airport code for Capitán Fuentes Martínez Airport, Porvenir, Magallanes y Antártica Chilena, Chile
 Weighted proportionality (WPR), in fair cake-cutting, a kind of fair-division problem
 WPR Records, a music label founded in 2004 by Luxembourger jazz musician Gast Waltzing

See also
 USCGC Ossipee (WPR-50), a United States Coast Guard cutter launched in 1915
 WPRS (disambiguation)